is a Japanese former actor, voice actor and narrator from Mikasa, Hokkaidō. He switched from going by his real name, Shunji Yamada, to going by Keaton Yamada in the 1980s. He is currently represented by Remax.

On December 5, 2020, it was announced Yamada will step down as the narrator for Chibi Maruko-Chan in 2021. On December 7, 2020, he retired from voice acting in March 2021.

Filmography

Television animation
Ganbare!! Robokon (1974) (Roboton)
Getter Robo (1974) (Hayato Jin, Narrator)
Chou Genji Robo Combattler V (1975) (Juuzou Naniwa)
Ikkyū-san (1975) (Ashikaga Yoshimitsu)
Wakusei Robo Danguard A (1977) (Tony Harken)
Galaxy Express 999 (1978) (C62-50 Locomotive)
Cyborg 009 (1979) (Albert Heinrich/004)
Attacker You! (1983) (Announcer)
Giant Gorg (1984) (Dr. Wave)
Mobile Suit Zeta Gundam (1985) (Jamaican Daninghan)
Saint Seiya (1986) (Lyumnades Caça)
Sakigake!! Otokojuku (1988) (Baron Dino)
Dragon Quest (1989) (Yanack)
Chibi Maruko-chan (1990-2021) (Narrator)
Bonobono (1995) (Fennec Kitsune-kun's father)
Digimon Adventure (1999) (Bakemon)

OVA
Legend of the Galactic Heroes (1993) (Alex Caselnes)
Birdy the Mighty (1996) (Kouichirou)
Master Keaton (1998) (Narrator)

Animated films
Super Mario Bros.: The Great Mission to Rescue Princess Peach! (1986) (Hammer Bros.)
Mobile Suit Zeta Gundam: A New Translation - Heirs to the Stars (2005) (Jamaican Daninghan)
Mobile Suit Zeta Gundam: A New Translation II - Lovers (2005) (Jamaican Daninghan)

Dubbing roles
Galaxy of Terror (1989 TBS edition) (Ranger (Robert Englund))
Runaway Bride (Fisher (Héctor Elizondo))

References

External links
 Official agency profile 
 
 
 

1945 births
Living people
Male voice actors from Hokkaido
Japanese male video game actors
Japanese male voice actors
People from Mikasa, Hokkaido
Aoni Production voice actors
Ken Production voice actors
Production Baobab voice actors